The Finn Valley Railway (FVR) was a  gauge railway in Ireland.

History

Incorporation
The Finn Valley Railway Company was incorporated on 15 May 1860 with capital of £60,000.

Personnel
The Chairman of the directors was The 4th Viscount Lifford, whose seat was Meenglass Castle, just south-east of Ballybofey, and the Deputy-Chairman was James Thompson Macky of the Bank of Ireland in Derry.

The other directors were:
Robert Collum, 1 Chester Place, Hyde Park Square, London
Edward Hunter, The Glebe, Blackheath, Kent
Maurice Ceely Maude, Lenaghan, Enniskillen
Sir Samuel Hercules Hayes, 4th Baronet, Leuaghan, Stranorlar
Robert Russell, Salthill, Mountcharles
Major Humphreys, Milltown House, Strabane

The other offices of the company were:
James Alex Ledlie, Stranorlar, Secretary
Peter W. Barlow, 26 Great George Street, Westminster, Consulting Engineer
John Bower, Engineer

Opening
A  gauge rail line between Stranorlar and Strabane was opened on 1 October 1863.

Operation
The directors entered into a contract with the Irish North Western Railway to work the line for a period of 10 years. This company became amalgamated with the Great Northern Railway (Ireland) in 1876.

Merger and gauge conversion
In 1892, the line merged with the West Donegal Railway into a new company, the Donegal Railway Company. The line from Stranorlar to Strabane was reconstructed to  gauge shortly afterwards.

Footnotes

Railway companies established in 1860
Railway companies disestablished in 1892
Irish gauge railways
Great Northern Railway (Ireland)
Closed railways in Northern Ireland
Defunct railway companies of Ireland
Transport in County Donegal
Transport in County Tyrone
Railway lines opened in 1863